The Chinese Taipei Fed Cup team represents the Republic of China in Fed Cup tennis competition and are governed by the Chinese Taipei Tennis Association. They currently compete in the World Group II play-offs.

History

Chinese Taipei competed in its first Fed Cup in 1972.  They reached the round of 16 in 1981 and the World Group II play-offs in 1999, 2007, 2016, 2017.

2022

 Lee Ya-Hsin (Singles – WTA #1202; Doubles – WTA #638)
  Yang Ya-Yi  (Singles – WTA #521; Doubles – WTA #434)
 Li Yu-Yun (Singles – WTA #1072)
 Hsu Chieh-Yu (Singles – WTA #673; Doubles – WTA #290)
  Lee Pei-Chi  (Singles – WTA #488; Doubles – WTA #257)

2021

 Hsieh Su-Wei (Singles – WTA #93; Doubles – WTA #4)
 Liang En-Shuo (Singles – WTA #228; Doubles – WTA #243)
 Yang Ya-Yi (Singles – WTA #978)
 Chan Yung-Jan (Doubles – WTA #24)
 Chan Hao-Ching (Doubles – WTA #24)

2019

 Liang En-Shuo (Singles – WTA #228; Doubles – WTA #243)
 Lee Ya-Hsuan (Singles – WTA #359; Doubles – WTA #216)
 Hsu Chieh-Yu (Singles – WTA #620; Doubles – WTA #228)
 Chan Yung-Jan (Doubles – WTA #24)
 Chan Hao-Ching (Doubles – WTA #24)

2018

 Hsu Chieh-Yu (Singles – WTA #620; Doubles – WTA #228)
 Lee Ya-Hsuan (Singles – WTA #359; Doubles – WTA #216)
 Lee Pei-Chi (Singles – WTA #678; Doubles – WTA #469)
 Hsu Ching-Wen (Doubles – WTA #620)

2017

WG II Quarter Final 

 Chang Kai-Chen (Singles – WTA #964; Doubles – WTA #746)
 Lee Ya-Hsuan (Singles – WTA #359; Doubles – WTA #216)
 Hsu Ching-Wen (Doubles – WTA #620)
 Chan Chin-Wei

WG II play-offs 

 Lee Ya-Hsuan (Singles – WTA #359; Doubles – WTA #216)
 Hsu Chieh-Yu (Singles – WTA #620; Doubles – WTA #228)
 Hsu Ching-Wen (Doubles – WTA #620)
 Chuang Chia-Jung

2016

Zone Group I 

 Chan Hao-Ching (Doubles – WTA #6)
 Chang Kai-Chen (Singles – WTA #142; Doubles – WTA #163)
 Chan Yung-Jan (Singles – WTA #564; Doubles – WTA #5)
 Hsieh Su-Wei (Singles – WTA #81; Doubles – WTA #34)

WG II play-offs 

 Lee Ya-Hsuan (Singles – WTA #199; Doubles – WTA #157)
 Hsu Ching-Wen (Singles – WTA #337; Doubles – WTA #201)
 Chuang Chia-Jung (Doubles – WTA #34)
 Chan Chin-Wei (Doubles – WTA #83)

2015

 Chan Hao-Ching (Singles – WTA #1198; Doubles – WTA #37)
 Chan Yung-Jan (Singles – WTA #180; Doubles – WTA #23)
 Hsieh Su-Wei (Singles – WTA #152; Doubles – WTA #5)
 Lee Ya-Hsuan (Singles – WTA #393; Doubles – WTA #386)

2014

 Chan Chin-Wei (Singles – WTA #431)
 Juan Ting-Fei (Singles – WTA #0)
 Lee Ya-Hsuan (Singles – WTA #372)
 Yang Chia-Hsien (Singles – WTA #1135)

2013

 Chan Chin-Wei (Singles – WTA #262)
 Chang Kai-Chen (Singles – WTA #114)
 Lee Hua-Chen (Singles – WTA #460)

2012 

 Chang Kai-Chen (Singles – WTA #86)
 Chan Yung-Jan (Singles – WTA #118)
 Chuang Chia-Jung (Singles – WTA #117)
 Hsieh Su-Wei (Singles – WTA #27)

See also

Fed Cup

Chinese Taipei Davis Cup team

External links

Billie Jean King Cup teams
Fed Cup
Fed Cup